The 1980 Dunedin mayoral election was part of the New Zealand local elections held that same year. In 1980, elections were held for the Mayor of Dunedin plus other local government positions including twelve city councillors. The polling was conducted using the standard first-past-the-post electoral method.

Background
Cliff Skeggs was re-elected Mayor of Dunedin with a record majority. The Labour party did not contest the mayoralty for the first time since 1935. As such the contest was marked by low turnout. Skeggs sole opponent was local historian Peter Entwisle who stood only as part of a campaign against the building of an aluminium smelter at Aramoana. The election also saw longtime Labour Party councillor Ethel McMillan defeated in a shock result.

Results
The following table shows the results for the election:

References

Mayoral elections in Dunedin
Dunedin
Politics of Dunedin
1980s in Dunedin
October 1980 events in New Zealand